Ypsolopha sarmaticella is a moth of the family Ypsolophidae. It is known from Finland, Estonia, Latvia, Russia (Russian Plain, the West Siberian Plain and the South Siberian Mountains) and Ukraine.

The wingspan is about 15 mm.

The larvae have been recorded feeding on Caragana species.

References

External links
lepiforum.de

Ypsolophidae
Moths of Europe
Moths of Asia